Ultimate Collection is a compilation album by American recording artist Anastacia, released on November 6, 2015 by Sony Music. The album includes singles from five of the singer's previous albums Not That Kind (2000), Freak of Nature (2001),  Anastacia (2004), It's a Man's World (2012), Resurrection (2014) and songs taken from Anastacia's first greatest hits  Pieces of a Dream (2005). Two new songs are also contained in the track list: a cover of Christina Aguilera's "Army of Me" and the lead single, "Take This Chance". Singles from Anastacia's fourth album  Heavy Rotation (2008) were excluded from the project.

Background
In August 2015, it was announced that after nine years, Anastacia had reunited with her original label Sony Music Entertainment.

Promotion
On October 31, Anastacia performed at Heaven Night Club. The performance included the new song "Army of Me", as well as "Paid My Dues", "I'm Outta Love" and "Left Outside Alone".
On November 4, she went to BBC Breakfast as well as BBC Radio Wales. On November 6, Anastacia was interviewed at ITV's Lorraine.
On November 7, she appear and perform 2 songs on BBC Radio 2 and on November 8, she appear on The National Lottery Live.

To further promote the compilation, Anastacia embarked on the accompanying the Ultimate Collection Tour in April 2016.

Track listing

Charts

Certifications

Release history

References

2015 greatest hits albums
Anastacia albums
Albums produced by Johan Carlsson